Sudden Bill Dorn is a 1937 American Western film by Universal Pictures directed by Ray Taylor and starring Buck Jones as Bill Dorn. The film has been described as "slow-paced" and "confusing" with the plot and storyline being difficult to follow, typical of Jones' later Universal output of which Sudden Bill Dorn was the last.

References

External links 
 

1937 films
1937 Western (genre) films
American Western (genre) films
American black-and-white films
Films directed by Ray Taylor
1930s American films